The Detroit St. Patrick's Parade is an annual parade held on the Sunday preceding St. Patrick's Day Corktown, Detroit, Michigan.

The parade has been held each year since 1958 (except 2020 & 2021 due to the COVID-19 pandemic), and is hosted by the United Irish Societies. The first parade was in Dearborn, Michigan. Today, the Parade route begins at UIS Irish Plaza and follows along Michigan Avenue and proceeds through Corktown.

See also

Culture of Detroit
List of holiday parades

References

External links
 detroitstpatricksparade.com, The United Irish Society's official website for the parade

Annual events in Michigan
Corktown, Detroit
Culture of Detroit
Parades in the United States
Recurring events established in 1958
Tourist attractions in Detroit
Festivals established in 1958
Parade (Detroit, MI)